Svetly (lit light, clear; , Sibietley) is an urban locality (an urban-type settlement) in Mirninsky District of the Sakha Republic, Russia, located  from Mirny, the administrative center of the district, on the southern edge of the Vilyuy Plateau (a part of the Central Siberian Plateau), not far from the right bank of the Vilyuy River. As of the 2010 Census, its population was 3,137.

History
It was founded in the late 1970s as a works base for construction of a dam and hydroelectric plant, downstream of the larger Vilyuy Dam. With the economic difficulties in the Soviet Union during the 1980s and in Russia during the 1990s, completion of the project was greatly delayed with the hydroelectric plant only beginning power generation between 2004 and 2008, with three of the four planned turbines in operation.

Urban-type settlement status was granted to Svetly in 1984.

Administrative and municipal status
Within the framework of administrative divisions, the urban-type settlement of Svetly is incorporated within Mirninsky District as the Settlement of Svetly. As a municipal division, the Settlement of Svetly is incorporated within Mirninsky Municipal District as Svetly Urban Settlement.

Economy
Vilyuyskaya GES-3 hydroelectric plant, with a capacity of 270 MW, is the principal employer. The power plant is managed by a daughter company of diamond mining corporation ALROSA. Many of the settlement's inhabitants also commute for week-by-week shift work in remote diamond mines or in construction projects throughout the western region of the Sakha Republic, including the Eastern Siberia–Pacific Ocean oil pipeline.

Svetly is connected by a  road with the Anabar Highway between Mirny and Chernyshevsky.

References

Notes

Sources
Official website of the Sakha Republic. Registry of the Administrative-Territorial Divisions of the Sakha Republic. Mirninsky District. 

Urban-type settlements in the Sakha Republic